Chahār Bāgh School or the Chahār Bāgh Madrasa, also known as  Madrasa Madar-i Shah, is a 17-18th century cultural complex in Isfahan, Iran.

The compound was built during the time of Soltan Hossein, a Safavid king, to serve as a theological and clerical school to train those who were interested in such sciences. In order to finance the school, Soltan Hossein's mother had a large caravansary built nearby, the income of which went to the foundation. The monumental portal from the main avenue of Shah Abbas leads directly into a domed octagonal vestibule. The dome and the greater part of the walls are covered in bright yellow bricks which give a feeling of lightness. The entrance gate decorated with gold facade and silver, and the tile-works inside the building are masterpieces of fine art and industry. The central court, with its pool and garden, are surrounded by arcades on two levels, each giving access to a student's room.

Gallery

See also
Iranian architecture
History of Persian domes

References

Buildings and structures completed in the 17th century
Education in Isfahan
Architecture in Iran
Buildings and structures in Isfahan
Tourist attractions in Isfahan
Madrasas in Iran